"" (French for "Hymn to Love") is a popular French song originally performed by Édith Piaf.

Édith Piaf
The lyrics were written by Piaf and the music by Marguerite Monnot. It was written to her lover and the love of her life, the French boxer, Marcel Cerdan. On October 28, 1949, Cerdan was killed in the crash of Air France Flight 009 on his way from Paris to New York to come to see her. She recorded the song on May 2, 1950.

English versions
"" was translated into English by Piaf's protégé Eddie Constantine as "Hymn to Love", which was recorded by Piaf on her album La Vie En Rose / Édith Piaf Sings In English (1956). This version was featured on Cyndi Lauper's 2003 album At Last.

It was also adapted into English as "If You Love Me (Really Love Me)" with lyrics by Geoffrey Parsons. Kay Starr brought fame to this version in 1954, with her version reaching No. 4 on Billboards charts of Best Sellers in Stores and Most Played by Jockeys. Starr's version was ranked No. 20 on Billboards ranking of 1954's Most Popular Records According to Retail Sales and No. 20 on Billboards ranking of 1954's Most Popular Records According to Disk Jockey Plays.

Mary Hopkin released a version of "If You Love Me (Really Love Me)" in 1976, which reached No. 32 on the UK Singles Chart. In 1998, Patti LaBelle included a live version of "If You Love Me (Really Love Me)" on her Grammy-winning album Live! One Night Only.

Japanese versions
The song became one of her signature songs, amassing around 2,000,000 copies sold of various singles featuring this song. "Love Hymn" was covered by Keiko Masuda in her 2014 covers album .

"" was covered by Japanese singer-songwriter Hikaru Utada in 2010, under the name . The title is unique to Utada's version, as most Japanese renditions have the same title as Fubuki Koshiji's 1951 cover, "Ai no Sanka". Utada's version reached No. 5 on Billboard Adult Contemporary Airplay, No. 7 on Billboard Japan Hot 100, and No. 19 on RIAJ Digital Track Chart Top 100.

Singer-actress Atsuko Maeda performed the Japanese version of the song in the 2019 film To the Ends of the Earth. The lyrics also give the film its title.
The song was performed by Milet at the closing ceremony of the Tokyo 2020 Olympic Games on August 8, 2021.

In literature
The song is a central plot point to Anne Wiazemsky's 1996 autobiographical novel , which won the Prix Maurice Genevoix that year.

References

External links
 "Hymne à l'amour" (1950) by Édith Piaf
 French lyrics with English translation and video clip

1950 songs
1950 singles
French songs
Édith Piaf songs
Songs with lyrics by Édith Piaf
Songs with lyrics by Geoffrey Parsons (lyricist)
Songs with music by Marguerite Monnot
Pathé-Marconi singles